Volkert, Inc. is a privately held consulting firm based in Mobile, Alabama.  The company offers engineering, environmental consulting, program management, and construction services. It was founded in 1925 in New Orleans as Doullut and Ewin, Inc.  The company operates with a workforce of 1200 people at more than 50 offices in 20 states and the District of Columbia.  Volkert was ranked at 88 among the top 500 design firms in the United States in 2022 by Engineering News-Record,

History
The company was founded in 1925 in New Orleans as Doullut and Ewin, Inc.  It relocated to Mobile in 1946 and was reorganized as J. P. Ewin, Inc.  It was renamed as the Ewin Engineering Corporation in 1950.  David G. Volkert took possession of the company in 1954.  The company was renamed as David Volkert & Associates, Inc. in 1963.  An employee stock ownership plan was begun in 1975.  New subsidiaries, Volkert Construction Services, Inc. and Volkert Environmental Group, Inc. were created in 1984 and 1985.  It was again renamed in 1999, this time as Volkert & Associates, Inc.  David G. Volkert died in 2001.  The firm was inducted into the Alabama Engineering Hall of Fame in 2003.  It was renamed as Volkert, Inc. in 2009.  Its purchase of Allied Engineering and Testing Inc. of Fort Myers, Florida was announced in October 2012.  Allied Engineering and Testing Inc. employed 90 people in five Florida-based offices at the time of acquisition.  The company announced that there were no immediate plans to modify the operations or staffing levels of the acquired company.

Projects

Arena Stage, Washington, D.C.
Arlington National Cemetery Visitors Center, Arlington County, Virginia
Central Station, Birmingham, Alabama
Capital Beltway Bridge (I-495), Forest Glen Park, Maryland
Clearwater Pass Bridge, Clearwater, Florida
Cochrane–Africatown USA Bridge, Mobile, Alabama
Crescent City Connection approaches, New Orleans, Louisiana
Danziger Bridge, New Orleans, Louisiana
Interstate 10 twin bridges, Mobile Bay, Alabama
Interstate 165, North Section, Mobile, Alabama
L'Enfant Plaza roadway, Washington, D.C.
Lake Pontchartrain Causeway bascule bridges, New Orleans, Louisiana
McDuffie Terminal at Alabama State Docks, Mobile, Alabama
Mobile Regional Airport Terminal Complex, Mobile, Alabama
Panama City-Bay County International Airport Terminal, Panama City, Florida
Perdido Pass Bridge, Orange Beach, Alabama
Robert F. Kennedy Memorial Stadium, Washington, D.C.
Shelton State Community College campus, Tuscaloosa, Alabama
Smithsonian Metro Station, Washington, D.C.
United States Navy Memorial, Washington, D.C.

References

Companies based in Mobile, Alabama
Consulting firms established in 1925
Engineering consulting firms of the United States
1925 establishments in Louisiana